Peter Nazareth (born 27 April 1940) is a Ugandan-born literary critic and writer of fiction and drama.

Life
Peter Nazareth was born in Uganda of Indian Goan ancestry, and his mother's family was earlier based in Malaya-Malaysia-Singapore. He was educated at Makerere University (Kampala, Uganda), where he received his BA in English Literature in 1962, and at the universities of London and Leeds in England.

While residing in Africa, he simultaneously served as senior finance officer in Idi Amin's finance ministry until 1973, when he accepted a fellowship at Yale University and emigrated to the United States from Uganda.

In academia

He is a professor of English and African-American World Studies at the University of Iowa, where he is also a consultant to the International Writing Program. Nazareth taught that university's course "Elvis as Anthology", which explores the deep mythological roots of Elvis Presley's roles in popular culture. This class on Elvis led to Nazareth being interviewed by a range of publications — The Wall Street Journal, UPI, AP, World News Tonight With Peter Jennings, NBC's The Today Show, ABC Chicago, MTV, Voice of America, National Public Radio, the BBC, and the Cedar Rapids Gazette, among others, according to his cv. 

He teaches and has written about African, Caribbean, African-American, Goan, and other literatures. His publications include In the Trickster Tradition: The Novels of Andrew Salkey, Francis Ebejer, and Ishmael Reed (1994); Edwin Thumboo: Creating a Nation Through Poetry (2008); and the long essay "Elvis as Anthology" in Vernon Chadwick (ed.), In Search of Elvis: Music, Race, Art, Religion. Nazareth edited Critical Essays on Ngugi wa Thiong'o (2000) and Pivoting on the Point of Return: Modern Goan Literature (2010). His first novel, In a Brown Mantle (1972), has been taught at the University of Pretoria and by Ngugi wa Thiong’o at U.C. Irvine.

His literary criticisms have often involved observations of the fate of diverse global economic and academic migrants, spanning the Asian, African and black American cultural histories. This includes the Goan diaspora settled in Western countries, the post-Idi Amin Asian emigration from Eastern Africa, and the cultural superstitions of the pre-Obama presidency of American politics. Nazareth has edited a special issue of the journal Callaloo on Goan literature, and an anthology of its literature, and has championed the work of Mozambique-born Goan writer Violet Dias Lannoy.

Family

He has been married to Mary Nazareth for more than 50 years. They have two daughters.

Works

Books 
 In a Brown Mantle, East African Literature Bureau, 1972; Nairobi: Kenya Literature Bureau, 1981.
 Literature and Society in Modern Africa, East African Literature Bureau, 1972; Kenya Literature Bureau, 1980; published as An African View of Literature, Evanston: Northwestern University Press, 1974.
 Two Radio Plays, East African Literature Bureau, 1976.
 The Third World Writer: His Social Responsibility, Nairobi: Kenya Literature Bureau, 1978.
 Literature of the African Peoples, Study Guide for Independent Study with audiotape/CD, Center for Credit Programs, The University of Iowa, 1983.
 A Feny Fele, Budapest: Europa Publishing House, 1984 (selected essays in Hungarian translation)
 The General is Up, Toronto: TSAR Books, 1991
 In the Trickster Tradition: The Novels of Andrew Salkey, Francis Ebejer and Ishmael Reed, London: Bogle-L'Ouverture Press, 1994.
 Edwin Thumboo: Creating a Nation Through Poetry, Singapore: Interlogue Series Vol. 7, Ethos Books, 2008.

Ebooks
 Re-Membering Singapore.
 Elvis -- Rewriting the World through Multicultural Movies.

Edited anthologies 
 African Writing Today, special issue of Pacific Quarterly Moana, Hamilton, New Zealand: Outrigger Publishers, Vol. 6, No. 3/4, 1981.
 Goan Literature: A Modern Reader, issue of the Journal of South Asian Literature, East Lansing: Michigan State University, 1983.
 Critical Essays on Ngũgĩ wa Thiong'o, New York: G.K. Hall, 2000.
 Uganda South Asians Exodus: Kololian Perspectives (co-edited), University of Toronto, 2002.

References

External links
 Megan Carney, "Peter Nazareth, Ugandan Born UI Professor Enlivens Classes with His Multi-cultural Heritage", The Iowa Source, 8 February 2008.
 One of a Kind: Peter Nazareth
 Books by Peter Nazareth
 Peter Nazareth, Ugandan and UI Professor, Feb08 | Ugandan Born UI Professor Enlivens Classes with His Multi-cultural Heritage
 Peter Nazareth, University of Iowa

Ugandan emigrants to the United States
Ugandan academics
Living people
1940 births
Makerere University alumni
Alumni of the University of London
Alumni of the University of Leeds
Yale University faculty
University of Iowa faculty
Ugandan people of Goan descent
Literary critics
Ugandan dramatists and playwrights

International Writing Program alumni
Ugandan expatriates in the United Kingdom